{{DISPLAYTITLE:C8H7N3O5}}
The molecular formula C8H7N3O5 (molar mass: 225.16 g/mol, exact mass: 225.0386 u) may refer to:

 Dinitolmide, also known as zoalene
 Furazolidone

Molecular formulas